This is a list of Colorado wildfires which have occurred periodically throughout its recorded history.

One of the most significant fires in United States history was The Big Blowup of 1910. In that fire, 3 million acres burned and 78 firefighters were killed in the northern Rocky Mountains (in the states of Washington, Idaho, and Montana) which led to a standing policy in Colorado of all fires out by 10 am. The policy evolved over the 20th century.

The Colorado State Forest Service was established by the Colorado General Assembly in 1955 and oversees response to wildfires in Colorado.

Part of the 2002 Colorado wildfires that burned nearly 360,000 acres, the Hayman Fire was the largest wildfire in Colorado state history for nearly 20 years until the Pine Gulch Fire surpassed it in August 2020. The Cameron Peak Fire became the largest wildfire in Colorado history seven weeks later, at a size of 206,667 burned acres as of October 21, 2020. The 2012 Colorado forest fires broke the record for most destructive fire twice and led to declaration of a federal disaster area in June 2012. The 2013 Colorado forest fires, fueled by high heat and winds again broke the record for the most destructive and included what was the second largest fire (by area) in Colorado history until being surpassed by several fires in 2020. With multiple record-breaking fires, the 2020 Colorado wildfire season became the largest in the state's history after burning .

List of fires
This list only covers the largest, most destructive fires in Colorado history. Colorado State University (CSU) has information on named fires from 1976 to 2006 and total wildfires from 1960 to 2009. Notable fires from before 1980 are also included, sourced mainly from old newspapers and records. Acreage of fires that are partly in Colorado are indicated in red.

See also
2012 Colorado wildfires
2013 Colorado wildfires
2020 Colorado wildfires
Timeline of Colorado history

References

External links
Wildfire History – Colorado State Forest Service via Colorado State University
Colorado Mountain Home Wildfire Mitigation

Colorado
Wildfires